The Bridge between Madison and Mahoning Townships is a historic concrete arch bridge located at Madison Township and Mahoning Township in Armstrong County, Pennsylvania. It was built in 1895, and is a solid spandrel  two-span bridge. It crosses Mahoning Creek.

It was listed on the National Register of Historic Places in 1988.

References 

Road bridges on the National Register of Historic Places in Pennsylvania
Bridges completed in 1895
Bridges in Armstrong County, Pennsylvania
National Register of Historic Places in Armstrong County, Pennsylvania
Concrete bridges in the United States
Arch bridges in the United States